Chad Townsend (born 10 January 1991) is an Australian professional rugby league footballer who co-captains and plays as a goal-kicking  for the North Queensland Cowboys in the NRL.

He previously played for the Warriors and for the Cronulla-Sutherland Sharks over two separate spells in the National Rugby League. Townsend has also played at representative level for NSW City. He was part of the Cronulla team that won their maiden premiership title in the 2016 season, the only local junior player in that team.

Background
Townsend was born in Caringbah, Sydney, New South Wales, Australia.

Playing career

Early career
Townsend played his rugby league for the Yarrawarrah Tigers in the Cronulla-Sutherland local rugby league competition. During his junior football he was a part of 7 premiership teams.

Cronulla-Sutherland Sharks
After being signed by the Cronulla-Sutherland Sharks, Townsend made his debut in round 13 of the 2011 NRL season. In his first match, played against the Brisbane Broncos, he managed to convert two tries scored by fellow players Jon Mannah and Colin Best in the 40th and 80th minutes respectively. As a result of the injury of Albert Kelly early in the season and the subsequent poor performance of Cronulla's other half options, Townsend was given the opportunity to play in the NRL, after his good form in the Toyota Cup competition. He scored his first try in round 17 against the Rabbitohs. The Sharks won that game 26 - 4. Townsend represented the Junior Kangaroos in 2011 and the NSW under 18s and NSW CHS.

On 6 October 2013, Townsend was part of the Cronulla-Sutherland Sharks side which defeated Windsor Wolves 38-6 in the NSW Cup Grand Final.

New Zealand Warriors
Townsend joined the New Zealand Warriors for the 2014 NRL season, where he partnered Shaun Johnson in the halves.

The New Zealand Warriors missed the finals in both seasons that Townsend was at the club.

Return to Cronulla-Sutherland
It was announced in July 2015 that he would return to Cronulla-Sutherland in 2016 on a two-year contract.

On 2 October 2016, Townsend was part of the Cronulla-Sutherland side which won their first ever premiership defeating Melbourne 14-12 in the grand final.

In 2017, Townsend was part of the Cronulla side which qualified for the finals but were eliminated in week one losing to North Queensland 15-14 in a shock defeat. In 2018, Townsend kicked the winning field goal for Cronulla in their week two elimination final against Penrith.  The following week, Cronulla fell short of a grand final appearance losing to Melbourne 22-6 in the preliminary final. In 2019, Townsend was named Cronulla's player of the year. In 2020, Townsend was named in the Cronulla-Sutherland Sharks team of the decade. In round 17 of the 2020 NRL season, Townsend became the third player of the year to be sent off after he hit Newcastle player Kalyn Ponga with a shoulder charge.

Townsend played 12 games for Cronulla in the 2020 NRL season as the club finished 8th and qualified for the finals.  He played in Cronulla's elimination final loss against Canberra.

In round 2 of the 2021 NRL season, Townsend endured a horror night with the boot as he missed three from four conversions, including two in the final ten minutes as Cronulla lost 12-10 against Canberra at Kogarah Oval.

On 21 April 2021, Townsend signed a three-year deal with the North Queensland Cowboys starting in the 2022 season.

In round 11 of the 2021 NRL season, he kicked the winning field goal in Cronulla-Sutherland's 13-12 victory over fierce rivals St. George Illawarra in golden point extra-time.

Return to the New Zealand Warriors
On the 23 June 2021, it was announced that Townsend would leave the Cronulla-Sutherland Sharks to return to the New Zealand Warriors for the remainder of the 2021 NRL season, with the short term deal not affecting his 2022 deal with the North Queensland Cowboys.

In round 16, Townsend played his first game for the New Zealand Warriors since his return to the club, playing at halfback against the St. George Illawarra Dragons.  New Zealand would go on to lose the game 19-18, and to make matters worse Townsend picked up a shoulder injury, putting him out of play for an estimated 6–8 weeks.

North Queensland Cowboys
In round 1 of the 2022 NRL season, Townsend made his club debut for North Queensland in their 6-4 defeat against Canterbury at the Queensland Country Bank Stadium.
Townsend played 26 matches for North Queensland in the 2022 NRL season as the club finished third on the table and qualified for the finals.  Townsend played in both finals matches including their preliminary final loss to Parramatta.
In round 1 of the 2023 NRL season, Townsend kicked a field goal with five minutes remaining to seal a 19-18 victory over Canberra.

References

External links

Cronulla Sharks profile
Sharks profile
NRL profile

1991 births
Living people
Australian rugby league players
New South Wales City Origin rugby league team players
Cronulla-Sutherland Sharks players
Junior Kangaroos players
New Zealand Warriors players
North Queensland Cowboys players
Rugby league five-eighths
Rugby league halfbacks
Rugby league players from Sydney